The 9th Rifle Corps was a corps of the Red Army.  Located in Simferopol during the beginning of the war in the east.

History 
The corps headquarters was formed in accordance with orders of the North Caucasus Military District of 6 June and 26 August 1922. Its headquarters was initially located at Grozny, then relocated to Vladikavkaz in January 1923 and thence to Novocherkassk in August 1925. The corps included the 13th Rifle Division for the disarmament of population of Dagestan in August 1925 and the 9th Rifle Division for the suppression of Karachay rebels between April and May 1930. In May 1932 the corps headquarters was relocated to Krasnodar, where it remained until 1941.

In late May 1941 the corps was relocated to Crimea with headquarters at Simferopol. At the beginning of the war the corps was re-organized as the new 51st Army.  The corps was re-created in August than in May 1942 it was disbanded.  In 1942 it was reformed yet again than assigned to the 9th Army later in February 1943.  In 1944 it was assigned to the 28th Army as part of the 3rd Ukrainian Front where it remained until April 1945 when it transferred to the 5th Shock Army where it participated in both the Battle of Poznań and the Battle of Berlin where it later joined the Group of Soviet Forces in Germany, where was possibly disbanded later that year.  The corps was later disbanded in October 1946 when the 5th Shock Army was disbanded.

Structure before Operation Barbarossa 1941
Organization of the corps before the start of the war in the east:

 Headquarters - Simferopol
 Political Commissar, 9th Rifle Corps - Colonel Ivan Zakharovich Susaikov
 Chief of Staff, 9th Rifle Corps
 9th Corps Armoured Reconnaissance Squadron
 9th Corps Engineer Battalion
 9th Corps Signal Battalion
 9th Corps Field Medical Battalion
 9th Corps Supply Group
106th Rifle Division(Major general Aleksei Nokilayevich Pervushin)
156th Rifle Division (Major general Platon Vasilevich Cherniayev)
234th Rifle Division (Later added at start of war)
 32nd Cavalry Division (Colonel A. I. Batskalevich)
 Artillery Commander, 9th Rifle Corps - Major general Mikhail Mikhailovich Barsukov
 9th Corps Heavy Field Artillery Regiment
 9th Corps Field Artillery Regiment
 9th Corps Anti-Aircraft Battalion

Structure of the corps just before the 1944 operations
 Headquarters under Major General Ivan Rosly
 9th Corps Armoured Reconnaissance Squadron
 9th Corps Engineer Battalion
 9th Corps Signal Battalion
 9th Corps Field Medical Battalion
 9th Corps Supply Group
 Infantry Commander, 9th Corps
230th Rifle Division
 301st Rifle Division
 Artillery Commander, 9th Corps
 9th Corps Heavy Field Artillery Regiment
 9th Corps Field Artillery Regiment
 9th Corps Anti-Aircraft Battalion

References

Citations

Bibliography 

 

Rifle corps of the Soviet Union
Military units and formations established in 1939